A valentine is a card or gift given on Valentine's Day, or one's sweetheart.

Valentine or Valentines may also refer to:

People and fictional characters
 Valentine (name), a given name and a surname, including a list of people and fictional characters so named
 Saint Valentine of Rome, the eponym of Valentine's Day
 Valentine (writer), pseudonym of Archibald Thomas Pechey
 Gary Valentine, stage name of Gary Lachman (born 1955), American writer and guitarist, member of the band Blondie
 Funny Valentine, the main villain of Steel Ball Run

Places

United States
 Valentine, Arizona, an unincorporated community
 Valentine, Indiana, an unincorporated town
 Valentine, Kansas City, a neighborhood in Kansas City, Missouri
 Valentine, Nebraska, a city
 Valentine National Wildlife Refuge, Nebraska
 Valentine, New Jersey, an unincorporated community
 Valentine, Texas, a town
 Valentines, Virginia, an unincorporated community

Elsewhere
 Cape Valentine, Elephant Island, Antarctica
 Valentine, New South Wales, Australia, a suburb of Lake Macquarie
 Valentine Falls, a waterfall in New South Wales
 Valentine, Haute-Garonne, France, a commune
 Valentine (river), a river in the Haute-Vienne department, France
 Valentines, Uruguay, a town

Buildings
 Valentine Theatre, Toledo, Ohio
 The Valentine, a museum of local history in Richmond, Virginia

Arts and entertainment

Film and television
 Valentine (film), a 2001 horror film
 Valentine (2017 film), a documentary by Paul Thomas Anderson about the making of the album Something to Tell You 
 Valentine (TV series), an American romantic comedy-drama television show
 "Valentine" (The Secret Circle), a 2012 episode of The Secret Circle

Literature
 Valentine (novel) an 1832 novel by George Sand
 Valentines (short story collection), a 2007 collection of short stories by Olaf Olafsson

Performers and labels
 Valentine Records, an independent British label
 The Valentines (doo-wop band), an American group of the mid-1950s
 The Valentines (rock band), an Australian band active from 1966–1970

Albums
 Valentine (Snail Mail album) (2021)
 Valentine (Bill Frisell album) (2020)
 Valentine (Roy Harper album) (1974)
 Valentines (EP), by Mariah Carey (1999)

Songs
 "Valentine" (5 Seconds of Summer song) (2018)
 "Valentine" (Jim Brickman song) (1997), a hit for Martina McBride
 "Valentine" (Maurice Chevalier song) (1925)
 "Valentine" (Delays song) (2006)
 "Valentine" (Lloyd song) (2007)
 "Valentine" (T'Pau song) (1988)
 "Valentine" (Jessie Ware and Sampha song) (2011)
 "Valentine", by Fiona Apple from The Idler Wheel...
 "Valentine", by Blonde Redhead
 "Valentine", by Justice from Cross
 "Valentine", by Kina Grannis
 "Valentine", by Snail Mail from Valentine
 "Valentine", by Tatiana Okupnik
 "Valentine", by Train from A Girl, a Bottle, a Boat
 "Valentine", by Xandria from Neverworld's End
 "Valentine", by XXXTentacion from Revenge
 "Valentine", by YK Osiris from The Golden Child
 "Valentine", by the Get Up Kids from Something to Write Home About
 "Valentine", by the Replacements from Pleased to Meet Me
 "Valentine", from the musical Love Birds
 "My Funny Valentine" by Richard Rodgers and Lorenz Hart from the musical Babes In Arms

Sea vessels
 HMS Valentine, four Royal Navy vessels
 USS Valentine (AF-47), a 1945 World War II stores ship
 Valentine (1780 EIC ship), an East Indiaman

Other uses
 Valentine School (disambiguation)
 Valentine tank, a British Second World War tank model
 447 Valentine, an asteroid
 Valentine (restaurant), a chain in Quebec, Canada
 Valentine, a racehorse who competed in the 1840 Grand National Steeplechase
 Valentine, a sunflower variety
 Valentine Formation, a geologic unit in Nebraska, United States

See also
 Valentin
 Valentine Building (disambiguation)
 Valentine House (disambiguation)

 Valentiner (disambiguation)
 Valentinian (disambiguation)

 Valentin (disambiguation)
 Valentina (disambiguation)
 Valentini (disambiguation)
 Valentino (disambiguation)
 Valentinus (disambiguation)

ro:Valentin
ru:Валентин
th:วาเลนไทน์